Oussama Boughanmi (born 5 February 1990) is a Tunisian handball player for Espérance de Tunis and the Tunisian national team.

He competed for the Tunisian national team at the 2012 Summer Olympics in London, where the Tunisian team reached the quarterfinals.  He also participated at the 2016 Summer Olympics.

Honours

Club
Club Africain
Arab Club Championship
 Winner: 2012 Berkane
Tunisia National Cup
 Winner: 2011

Espérance de Tunis
Arab Club Championship
 Winner: 2018 Sfax, 2021 Hammamet, 2022 Hammamet

Tunisian Handball League
 Winner: 2015–16, 2016–17, 2018–19, 2019–20, 2020–21

Tunisia National Cup
 Winner: 2018, 2021

African Handball Super Cup
 Winner: 2016, 2019

National team
African Championship
 Winner: 2012 Morocco
 Silver Medalist: 2014 Algeria, 2016 Egypt, 2020 Tunisia

Pan Arab Games
 Bronze Medalist: 2011 Qatar

Junior World Championship
 Bronze Medalist: 2011 Greece

Individual
Best left wing in the 2011 Junior world championship
Best left wing in the 2009 Youth world championship

References

External links

1990 births
Living people
Sportspeople from Tunis
Tunisian male handball players
Olympic handball players of Tunisia
Handball players at the 2012 Summer Olympics
Expatriate handball players
Tunisian expatriate sportspeople in France
Handball players at the 2016 Summer Olympics
Mediterranean Games competitors for Tunisia
Competitors at the 2013 Mediterranean Games
Competitors at the 2022 Mediterranean Games
21st-century Tunisian people
20th-century Tunisian people